The Hyde County Memorial Auditorium in Highmore, South Dakota was built in 1951.  It was listed on the National Register of Historic Places in 2018.

A community effort to build the auditorium began in 1945, and a fundraising campaign soon raised $25,000.  A bond issue was found to be unnecessary, and bond proceeds were returned.

It was designed by architect Ursa L. Freed in a transitional style between Art Deco architecture and Art Moderne architecture.

The building hosted basketball games, concerts, theater, and other community events.  The building also hosts some municipal offices.  A memorial plaque in the lobby lists local men and women who served in any war from the American Civil War on.

Its opening featured Yogi Yorgesson and the "Scandahoovians", his seven-piece band.

References

National Register of Historic Places in Hyde County, South Dakota
Art Deco architecture in South Dakota
Art Moderne architecture in South Dakota
Buildings and structures completed in 1951